Reactive neutrophilic dermatoses are a spectrum of conditions mediated by neutrophils, and typically associated with underlying diseases, such as inflammatory bowel disease and hematologic malignancy.

Conditions considered to be reactive neutrophilic dermatoses include:
Erythema nodosum
Marshall syndrome
Sweet syndrome (Acute febrile neutrophilic dermatosis)
Neutrophilic dermatosis of the dorsal hands (Pustular vasculitis of the dorsal hands)
Neutrophilic eccrine hidradenitis
Pyoderma gangrenosum
PAPA syndrome

References